Jaime M. Andrade, Jr. is the State Representative for Illinois' 40th District. He has served as a member of the Illinois House of Representatives since 2013. During his tenure, he has prioritized legislation that keeps pace with technology, protects the environment, and improves community safety. He won his first election in 2014, and was re-elected as a Democrat in 2016, 2018, and 2020. He acts in leadership as Assistant House Majority Leader.

District 
Andrade's current district is located on the northwest side of Chicago and includes Avondale, Irving Park, and Albany Park. The legislative remap following the 2020 Census will incorporate parts of North Center, Roscoe Village, and West Lakeview into Andrade's district.

Biography 
A long-time community leader and resident of the Irving Park neighborhood, Andrade has been praised for his community clean up efforts, making headlines when local pigeons took issue with his push for funds to clean up the local Blue Line (CTA) station. From 1998 until his appointment to the General Assembly he was an assistant to former Chicago alderman Richard Mell; he was also a Legislative Assistant and Assistant Sergeant-At-Arms for the Chicago City Council. As creator and former chair of the Cybersecurity, Data Analytics & IT Committee, Andrade wrote the first-of-its-kind legislation regulating the use of Artificial Intelligence (AI) in Illinois. The Artificial Intelligence Video Interview Act regulates Illinois employers’ use of AI in the interview and hiring process.

Tenure

Committee assignments 
Andrade is the founder and former Chairperson of the Cybersecurity, Data Analytics & IT Committee for the IL House of Representatives and is presently a member of the following committees and subcommittees:

Appropriations-General Services 
Cybersecurity, Data Analytics & IT Committee 
Executive 
Financial Institutions 
Human Services 
Labor & Commerce. 
Public Benefits Subcommittee 
Small Business, Technology, and Innovation 
Wage Policy & Study Subcommittee

Legislation 
Andrade has focused on crafting pro-active legislation that keeps Illinois up-to-date with the latest technological advances, protects the environment, and bolsters Illinois' fiscal health. He passed the first of its kind law banning the manufacture and sale of personal care products containing harmful plastic microbeads, a version of which was later signed into federal law by President Barack Obama. In 2021, he carried the Automatic Renewal Contract Act  to make cancelling subscriptions easier for online consumers, which later became law. That same year, he also carried the Illinois Sick Leave Act for Aviation Workers in the House. Taking effect in 2022, this allows more than 30,000 aviation workers in Illinois to use employer-provided sick leave to care for ill or injured loved ones.

Political positions 
Andrade supports affordable child care, community safety initiatives, elected school boards, environmental protections, immigrant reform, a socially and fiscally responsible state budget, small business relief, and a $15 minimum wage. He has a 100% voting record with the Illinois Environmental Council .

Electoral history
For the 2020 primary election, Andrade has been endorsed by:

US Congressman Jesús "Chuy" García
US Congressman Mike Quigley
Planned Parenthood
The Chicago Teachers Union
Illinois Federation of Teachers
Personal PAC
Illinois AFL-CIO
The Sierra Club
Chicago Sun-Times
Illinois Nurses Association
International Union of Operating Engineers Local 150
Equality IL PAC
Citizen Action Illinois
Stand for Children PAC
IL National Organization for Women
Gun Violence Prevention PAC Illinois
SEIU State Council
Northside Democracy for America
Alderman Carlos Ramirez Rosa
Alderman Scott Waguespack
State Senator Ram Villivalam
State Representative Will Guzzardi

For the 2016 primary election, Andrade was endorsed by:
The Chicago Teacher's Union
Illinois Federation of Teachers
Equality Illinois
Planned Parenthood Illinois Action Committee
Citizen Action Illinois
SEIU State Council
Associated Firefighters of Illinois
Alderman Carlos Ramirez Rosa
Alderman Nick Sposato
45th Ward Independent Democrats and 45th Ward Democratic Committeeman and Alderman John Arena

References

External links
Representative Jaime M. Andrade, Jr. - (D) IL 40th District - 101st General Assembly  
Representative Jaime M. Andrade, Jr. - (D) IL 40th District - 100th General Assembly at the Illinois General Assembly
 
 Biography at Ballotpedia
 Jaime Andrade State Website
Jaime Andrade Political Website 
https://www.facebook.com/IL40thDistrictJaimeAndrade/ verified State Facebook Page
https://www.facebook.com/RepJaimeAndrade/ verified Political Facebook Page

Living people
Democratic Party members of the Illinois House of Representatives
Year of birth missing (living people)
21st-century American politicians
Hispanic and Latino American state legislators in Illinois
Politicians from Chicago
DePaul University alumni